The color amber is a pure chroma color, located on the color wheel midway between the colors of yellow and orange.  The color name is derived from the material also known as amber, which is commonly found in a range of yellow-orange-brown-red colors; likewise, as a color amber can refer to a range of yellow-orange colors. In English, the first recorded use of the term as a color name, rather than a reference to the specific substance, was in 1500.

SAE/ECE amber

Amber is one of several technically defined colors used in automotive signal lamps. In North America, SAE standard J578 governs the colorimetry of vehicle lights, while outside North America the internationalized European ECE regulations hold force. Both standards designate a range of orange-yellow hues in the CIE color space as "amber".

In the past, the ECE amber definition was more restrictive than the SAE definition, but the current ECE definition is identical to the more permissive SAE standard. The SAE formally uses the term "yellow amber", though the color is most often referred to as "yellow". This is not the same as selective yellow, a color used in some fog lamps and headlamps.

Formal definitions
Previously, ECE amber was defined according to the 1968 Convention on Road Traffic, as follows:

Recent revisions to the ECE regulations have aligned ECE Amber with SAE Yellow, defined as follows:

The entirety of these definitions lie outside the gamut of the sRGB color space — such a pure color cannot be represented using RGB primaries. The color box shown above is a desaturated approximation, produced by taking the centroid of the standard definition and moving it towards the D65 white point, until it meets the sRGB gamut triangle.

Cultural use

Computers
 The Digital Equipment Corporation (DEC) VT220 computer terminals were available with amber phosphors in their CRTs.
Interior design
 The original Amber Room in the Catherine Palace of Tsarskoye Selo near Saint Petersburg was a complete chamber decoration of amber panels backed with gold leaf and mirrors. Due to its singular beauty, it was sometimes dubbed the "Eighth Wonder of the World".
Sports
 In Gaelic games, Armagh play in a darker amber color (the amber that is prevalent in the Irish flag), Offaly play in the original colors of the Irish flag (green, white and amber) and Kilkenny also play in black and amber, albeit a more yellow amber.
 Amber is a color worn by English football clubs Hull City AFC, Bradford City AFC, Barnet FC, Shrewsbury Town FC (As part of stripes), Mansfield Town, Cambridge United FC and Sutton United. The color is also worn by the Scottish football club Motherwell FC, as well as many other sports clubs around the world.
Traffic engineering

 Amber is used in traffic lights and turn signals.
Theatre
 Amber, sometimes named "Bastard Amber", along with 'Moonlight Blue', is one of the two most common colors used in stage lighting.

See also
List of colors

References

External links

UNECE Regulation No. 6: Uniform Provisions Concerning the Approval of Direction Indicators for Motor Vehicles and their Trailers (E/ECE/324-E/ECE/TRANS/505/Rev.1/Add.5/Rev.4)
UNECE Regulation No. 48: Uniform Provisions Concerning the Approval of Vehicles with Regard to the Installation of Lighting and Light-Signalling Devices (E/ECE/324-E/ECE/TRANS/505/Rev.1/Add.47/Rev.3/Amend.2)

Tertiary colors
Quaternary colors
ja:琥珀色